Harry Verelst (11 February 1734 – 24 October 1785) was a colonial administrator with the British East India Company and the governor of Bengal from 1767 to 1769.

Life
Verelst was born on 11 February 1734 in Hanbury, Worcestershire, to Robert and Elizabeth Verelst. His ancestors, portrait painters, came from Dordrecht and The Hague. He died on 24 October 1785 in Boulogne.

Career 
According to one source, Verelst came to Bengal in the service of the Company as early as 1749. Prior to the Battle of Plassey, he was taken prisoner by the ruler of Bengal Nawab Sirajuddowla. In June 1757, the Nawab was defeated at Plassey by the forces of Robert Clive, the event that marks the beginning of colonial rule in Bengal. Verelst was released from captivity once the battle was over. He served as a factor in Lakshmipur, and thereafter, in spite of his youth, he continued to achieve positions of responsibility. In 1758, he became a member of the Fort William Council. Two years later, he was sent to take control of the southern port of Chittagong, which had been ceded by the local ruler Mir Qasim.

Verelst ruled Chittagong for the next five years. His success in increasing tax revenues during this period was rewarded with further postings to Burdwan and Midnapur. In 1767, Robert Clive quit the governorship of Bengal. On 17 May of that year, the Company's Court of Directors chose Harry Verelst to replace him in Fort William. Verelst would occupy the post for the next two and a half years, until his resignation in December 1769. John Cartier was his successor. In 1771 he was appointed a director of the East India Company.

Family 
Verelst married Ann Wordsworth on 20 May 1771, and they had six daughters and four sons. 

The eldest son, Harry (1773–1837), married Elizabeth, daughter of Henry Arthur Herbert. The eldest daughter Anne married the Irish Member of Parliament Edward Synge Cooper.

References 

Attribution

1734 births
1785 deaths
British governors of Bengal
People from Wychavon (district)